A clout is a relatively short, thick nail with a large, flat head used for attaching sheet material to wooden frames or sheet. A typical use is fixing roofing felt to the top of a shed. Clouts are also used in timber fence palings. They are usually made of galvanised mild steel, but copper clouts are also available.

References

Nail (fastener)